This is a List of World War I monuments and memorials.

There are numerous World War I monuments and memorials in various countries. In the United States in 2017, a new national monument to commemorate the 100th anniversary of the war is planned by a WWI Centennial Commission.

Australia

in Queensland
Anzac Avenue Memorial Trees
Anzac Memorial Park, Townsville
Apple Tree Creek War Memorial
Aramac War Memorial
Atherton War Memorial
Barcaldine War Memorial Clock
Beaudesert War Memorial
Boonah War Memorial
Booval War Memorial
Brooweena War Memorial
Bulimba Memorial Park
Bundaberg War Memorial
Cairns War Memorial
Cardwell Divisional Board Hall
Charleville War Memorial
Chinchilla Digger Statue
Coorparoo School of Arts and RSL Memorial Hall
Cooyar War Memorial
Cunnamulla War Memorial Fountain
Dalby War Memorial and Gates
Esk War Memorial
Eumundi War Memorial Trees
Evelyn Scrub War Memorial
Finch Hatton War Memorial
First World War Honour Board, Lands Administration Building
First World War Honour Board, National Australia Bank (308 Queen Street)
Forest Hill War Memorial
Gair Park
Gayndah War Memorial
Goombungee War Memorial
Goomeri Hall of Memory
Goomeri War Memorial Clock
Goondiwindi War Memorial
Greenmount War Memorial
Gympie and Widgee War Memorial Gates
Gympie Memorial Park
Herberton War Memorial
Howard War Memorial
Ipswich Railway Workshops War Memorial
Isis District War Memorial and Shire Council Chambers
Ithaca War Memorial
Linville War Memorial
Lt Thomas Armstrong Memorial
Ma Ma Creek War Memorial
Manly War Memorial
Maroon War Memorial
Miriam Vale War Memorial
Mitchell War Memorial
Montville Memorial Precinct
Mowbray Park and East Brisbane War Memorial
Our Lady of Victories Catholic Church
Oxley War Memorial
Pimpama & Ormeau War Memorial
Pinkenba War Memorial
Rockhampton War Memorial
Roma War Memorial and Heroes Avenue
Sandgate War Memorial Park
Sarina War Memorial
Shrine of Remembrance, Brisbane
Sir William Glasgow Memorial
Soldiers Memorial Hall, Toowoomba
St Andrew's Presbyterian Memorial Church, Innisfail
Stanthorpe Soldiers Memorial
Strathpine Honour Board
Temple of Peace (Toowong Cemetery)
Tieri War Memorial
Toogoolawah War Memorial
Toowong Memorial Park
Townsville West State School
Traveston Powder Magazine
Victor Denton War Memorial
War Memorial Bridge, Brooweena
Warwick War Memorial
Weeping Mother Memorial
Westbrook War Memorial
Windsor War Memorial Park
Woody Point Memorial Hall
World War I Cenotaph, Mackay
World War I memorials in Queensland
Yeppoon War Memorial
Yeronga Memorial Park

besides in Queensland
Anzac Cottage
Anzac Parade, Canberra
ANZAC War Memorial
Australian War Memorial
Blackboy Hill, Western Australia
Fremantle War Memorial
Hobart Cenotaph
Johnstone Park
Kahibah Public School
Kemal Atatürk Memorial, Canberra
King George V Memorial
Mounted Memorial, Canberra
National War Memorial (South Australia)
Shrine of Remembrance
Sydney Cenotaph

France
List of World War I memorials and cemeteries in the Argonne
List of World War I memorials and cemeteries in Artois
List of World War I memorials and cemeteries in Champagne-Ardennes
List of World War I memorials and cemeteries in Flanders
List of World War I Memorials and Cemeteries in Lorraine
List of World War I memorials and cemeteries in the area of the St Mihiel salient
List of World War I memorials and cemeteries in the Somme
List of World War I memorials and cemeteries in Verdun

Germany 

 Kriegerdenkmal im Hofgarten (Munich)
 Laboe Naval Memorial
 Möltenort U-Boat Memorial
 Neue Wache
 Tannenberg Memorial (Demolished)

Russia 

 Monument to Heroes of World War I (Azov)
 Monument to heroes of World War I (Rostov-on-Don)

Serbia 

 Monument and Memorial Ossuary to the Defenders of Belgrade

Turkey 

 List of war cemeteries and memorials on the Gallipoli Peninsula
 57th Infantry Regiment Memorial
 Arıburnu Memorial
 Chunuk Bair Mehmetçik Memorials
 Çanakkale Martyrs' Memorial
 Gallipoli Newfoundland Memorial
 Helles Memorial
 Iğdır Genocide Memorial and Museum
 Lone Pine Memorial
 Respect to Mehmetçik Monument
 Stop Passenger! Monument
 Tarihe Saygı Anıtı‎

United Kingdom
in England
24th East Surrey Division War Memorial
29th Division War Memorial
Abinger Common War Memorial
African and Caribbean War Memorial
Andover War Memorial Hospital
Anglo-Belgian Memorial, London
Arch of Remembrance
Ashwell War Memorial
Australian War Memorial, London
Baltic Exchange Memorial Glass
Barrow Park Cenotaph
Birkenhead War Memorial
Blackburn War Memorial
Blackmoor War Memorial
Bootle War Memorial
Bournemouth War Memorial
Bradford War Memorial
Bridgwater War Memorial
Bristol Cenotaph
British Thomson-Houston Company War Memorial
Bromley Parish Church Memorial
Bromley War Memorial
Brookwood American Cemetery and Memorial
Busbridge War Memorial
Cambridge War Memorial
Canada Memorial
Carnforth War Memorial
Cavalry of the Empire Memorial
Cavell Van
The Cenotaph, Whitehall
Chatham Naval Memorial
Chattri, Brighton
Chester War Memorial
Chingford War Memorial
Chipping Barnet War Memorial
Christ Church War Memorial Garden
Civil Service Rifles War Memorial
Cockfosters War Memorial
County War Memorial, Nottingham
Crewe War Memorial
Croydon Cenotaph
Derby War Memorial
Devon County War Memorial
Dover Marine War Memorial
Dover Patrol Monument
Dulwich College War Memorial
Dulwich Old College War Memorial
Ealing War Memorial
East Barnet War Memorial
Edith Cavell Memorial
Equestrian statue of Edward Horner
Equestrian statue of Ferdinand Foch, London
Exeter War Memorial
Finchley War Memorial
Flanders Fields Memorial Garden
Fordham War Memorial
Fovant Badges
Friern Barnet Parishioners War Memorial
Fulham War Memorial
Gerrards Cross Memorial Building
Gleadless War Memorial
Golders Green War Memorial
Great Eastern Railway War Memorial
Great Missenden War Memorial
Great Western Railway War Memorial
Guards Memorial
Earl Haig Memorial
Hall of Memory, Birmingham
Hampstead War Memorial
Hampton Wick War Memorial
Hartburn War Memorial
Hatfield War Memorial
Helsby War Memorial
Hendon War Memorial
Holme Valley war memorial
Holy Island War Memorial
Hornsey War Memorial
Hove War Memorial
Hoylake and West Kirby War Memorial
Imperial Camel Corps Memorial
Inns of Court War Memorial
Islington Green War Memorial
King's Somborne War Memorial
Lancashire Fusiliers War Memorial
Lancaster Gate Memorial Cross
Leeds Rifles War Memorial
Lewes War Memorial
Liverpool Cenotaph
Livesey Hall War Memorial
London and North Western Railway War Memorial
London Troops War Memorial
London, Brighton and South Coast Railway War Memorial
Loughborough Carillon
Lower Swell War Memorial
Macclesfield War Memorial
Machine Gun Corps Memorial
Malvern Wells War Memorial
Manchester Cenotaph
Mells War Memorial
Memorial Gates, London
Midland Railway War Memorial
Miserden War Memorial
Monken Hadley War Memorial
Morecambe and Heysham War Memorial
Morley War Memorial, Scatcherd Park
Moulton War Memorial
Muncaster War Memorial
Municipal Gardens, Aldershot
National Submarine War Memorial
New Barnet War Memorial
New Zealand War Memorial, London
Nicholson War Memorial
North Eastern Railway War Memorial
North London Railway war memorial
Northampton War Memorial
Northumberland Fusiliers Memorial
Norwich War Memorial
Old Eldon Square War Memorial, Newcastle
Oldham War Memorial
Oxfordshire and Buckinghamshire Light Infantry War Memorial
Parliamentary War Memorial
Polish Forces War Memorial:National Memorial Arboretum
Port Sunlight War Memorial
Port Talbot War Memorial
Portland Cenotaph
Portuguese Fireplace
Potters Bar war memorial
Preston Cenotaph
Queen's Own Royal West Kent Regiment Cenotaph
Quintin and Alice Hogg Memorial
Radnor Gardens War Memorial
Rainham War Memorial
Redheugh Gardens War Memorial
Richmond War Memorial, London
Rifle Brigade War Memorial
Rochdale Cenotaph
Rolvenden War Memorial
Royal Air Force Memorial
Royal Artillery Memorial
Royal Berkshire Regiment War Memorial
Royal Fusiliers War Memorial
Royal Naval Division War Memorial
Runcorn War Memorial
St Michael Cornhill War Memorial
Sandhurst War Memorial
Sheffield War Memorial
Shot at Dawn Memorial
Silvertown War Memorial
The Cenotaph, Southampton
Southend-on-Sea War Memorial
Southport War Memorial
Southwark War Memorial
Spalding War Memorial
St Thomas' Peace Garden
Statue of the Earl Kitchener, London
Stockbridge War Memorial
Streatham War Memorial
Sutton War Memorial, London
Teddington Memorial Hospital
Todmorden War Memorial
Tower Hill Memorial
Trumpington War Memorial
University of Reading War Memorial
The Unknown Warrior
Verdun tree
Wagoners' Memorial
War Memorial Cross, Beeston
War Memorial Park, Coventry
War Memorial Shelters
Wargrave War Memorial
West Hartlepool War Memorial
Westerley Ware
Westfield War Memorial Village
Whipsnade Tree Cathedral
Widnes War Memorial
Winchester College War Cloister
Women of Steel
Wood Green War Memorial
Wyke Regis War Memorial
York and Lancaster Memorial, Sheffield
York City War Memorial
in Northern Ireland
Diamond War Memorial
in Scotland
Cameronians War Memorial
Kilmarnock War Memorial
Glasgow War Memorial
Scottish American Memorial
Scottish National War Memorial
in Wales
Monmouth War Memorial
Montgomeryshire County War Memorial
War Memorial of the Royal Monmouthshire Royal Engineers
Welch Regiment War Memorial

United States
 
American Doughboy Bringing Home Victory
Argonne Cross Memorial
List of memorials and monuments at Arlington National Cemetery
Camp Merritt Memorial Monument
Carmel-by-the-Sea World War I Memorial Arch
Century Tower (University of Florida)
The Dalles Civic Auditorium
District of Columbia War Memorial
Dover Patrol Monument
Elks National Veterans Memorial
Equestrian statue of Joan of Arc (Portland, Oregon)
Indiana World War Memorial Plaza
International World War Peace Tree
List of New York City parks relating to World War I
Littlefield Fountain
Memorial Arch (Huntington, West Virginia)
Memorial Gymnasium (University of Idaho)
Memorial Hall (Kansas City, Kansas)
Memorial Hall (Newark, Delaware)
Memorial Hall (University of Kentucky)
Memorial Park, Houston
Mojave Memorial Cross
National World War I Memorial (Washington, D.C.)
National World War I Museum and Memorial
Navy – Merchant Marine Memorial
Newton City Hall and War Memorial
Over the Top to Victory
Paragould War Memorial
Peace Cross
Rosedale World War I Memorial Arch
Sierra Madre Memorial Park
Soldiers and McKinley Memorial Parkways
Soldiers Memorial Military Museum
Spirit of the American Doughboy
Spirit of the American Navy
Tomb of the Known Soldier
Tomb of the Unknown Soldier (Arlington)
Victory Boulevard (Staten Island)
Victory Eagle
Virginia War Memorial
Waikiki Natatorium War Memorial
Washington Avenue Soldier's Monument and Triangle
Winged Victory (Lewis)
World War I Memorial (Atlantic City, New Jersey)
World War I Memorial (East Providence, Rhode Island)
World War I Memorial (Elkton, Maryland)
World War I Memorial (Norfolk, Connecticut)
World War I Memorial (Salem, Oregon)
World War I Memorial Flagpole (Hawkins)
World War Memorial (Kimball, West Virginia)
Young Memorial

References